In India, a Mayor heads a municipal corporation which governs respective Indian towns and cities. The Mayor of a city is the first citizen of that city. Municipal corporation mechanisms in India was introduced during British Rule with formation of municipal corporation in Madras (Chennai) in 1688, later followed by municipal corporations in Bombay (Mumbai) and Calcutta (Kolkata) by 1762. However the process of introduction for an elected President in the municipalities was made in Lord Mayo's Resolution of 1870. Since then the current form and structure of municipal bodies followed is similar to Lord Ripon's Resolution adopted in 1882 on local self-governance. The 74th Constitutional Amendment Act of 1992 was introduced providing for the transfer of 18 different powers to urban local bodies, including the election of a mayor and to recognise them which included Municipal Corporations, Nagar Panchayats, Municipal Councils.

History and Administration 

Many Municipal Corporations which are headed by Mayors, till the early 1990s were under the full control of the local governments with little functional, financial and administrative autonomy to the mayors. However with the introduction of The 74th Amendment Act of 1992 made provision for the urban local bodies (ULB) as self-governing institutions. Since it came into operation in April 1993, many salutary provisions were made in the Act with positive outcomes. However steps are being taken to dilute the powers of the local governments and heads of corporations or Mayors to have complete control of urban local bodies.

A mayor of a city though formally elected from amongst the corporators holds a ceremonial post and Municipal commissioner of Corporation and his staff who are drawn from the IAS cadre and appointed by the state government controls The executive, financial and administrative powers in the corporation.

Election and Tenure 

The method of electing mayor and their tenure varies for each city in India.  In Bengaluru (Karnataka) the election process is indirect with a tenure being for one year, in Mumbai (Maharashtra) it follows indirect elections with tenure for 2.5 years and Bhopal (Madhya Pradesh) follows a directly elected mayor with a term for five years.

Indian States of Haryana, Madhya Pradesh, Jharkhand, Uttar Pradesh, Chhattisgarh, Uttarakhand and Odisha had created respective provisions in the Acts governing Municipalities for the direct election of Mayors by citizens of cities.

Tenure of Mayors of cities in India varies from 1 year to 5 years.

Roles and Responsibilities 

Role of the mayor.

1) Governs the local civic body.

2) Fixed tenure varying in different towns.

3) First citizen of city.

4) Has two varied roles —  Representation and upholding of the dignity of the city during ceremonial times and a presiding over discussions of the civic house with elected representatives in functional capacity.

5)  The Mayor's role is confined to the corporation hall of  presiding authority at various meetings relating to corporation.

6)  The Mayor's role extends much beyond the local city and country as the presiding authority at corporation meetings during visits of a  foreign dignitary to the city as he is invited by the state government to receive and represent the citizens to the guest of honour.

7) At government, civic and other social functions he is given prominence.

Important Actions 

1. In 2021, All-India Mayor's Council held its 111th Convocation in Ayodhya, Uttar Pradesh,India with where the council head and  mayors of different states of India demanded rule of one nation and one election.

Related Links 

Mayors of Indian Cities

References

External links 
 Official Website

Lists of mayors of places in India